Köpekler Adası is a 1997 Turkish film, directed by Halit Refiğ and starring Mursit Bag, Ekrem Dümer, and Tanju Gürsu.

References

yapimci:Cavit Karabag

External links
Köpekler Adası at the Internet Movie Database

1997 films
Turkish mystery films
Films directed by Halit Refiğ